Louis Patris (born 7 June 2001) is a Belgian professional footballer who plays for OH Leuven in the Belgian First Division A. Patris made his debut for OH Leuven on 1 March 2021 in the home match against Antwerp.

References

External links

2001 births
Living people
Belgian footballers
Association football defenders
Oud-Heverlee Leuven players
Belgian Pro League players
People from Gembloux
Footballers from Namur (province)